Maine's 1st congressional district is a congressional district in the U.S. state of Maine. The geographically smaller of the state's two congressional districts, the district covers the southern coastal area of the state. The district consists of all of Cumberland, Knox, Lincoln, Sagadahoc, and York counties and most of Kennebec County. Located within the district are the cities of Portland, Augusta, Brunswick, and Saco. The district is currently represented by Democrat Chellie Pingree.

History

Maine was initially a part of the state of Massachusetts. Massachusetts was allocated 20 districts after the 1810 U.S. Census. When Maine became a state in 1820, seven of those districts were credited to it. Since then, all but the 1st and 2nd Congressional Districts have become obsolete.

Maine's 1st Congressional District consists of:

 Cumberland County
The following towns in Kennebec County:
 Augusta
 Chelsea
 China
 Farmingdale
 Hallowell
 Manchester
 Pittston
 Readfield
 Vassalboro
 Waterville
 Windsor
 Winslow
 Winthrop
 Knox County
 Lincoln County
 Sagadahoc County
 York County

Recent election results from presidential races

List of members representing the district

Election history

The 2018 election was the first to use ranked-choice voting as opposed to plurality voting since the district's creation. However, since the leading candidate had a majority of first-choice votes, no distribution of preferences was conducted.

See also 
 Maine's congressional districts
 List of United States congressional districts

Notes

References

Bibliography
 
 
 Congressional Biographical Directory of the United States 1774–present

External links
 U.S. House of Representatives

01
Cumberland County, Maine
Knox County, Maine
Lincoln County, Maine
Sagadahoc County, Maine
York County, Maine
Kennebec County, Maine
Constituencies established in 1820
Constituencies disestablished in 1883
1820 establishments in Maine
1883 disestablishments in Maine
Constituencies established in 1885
1885 establishments in Maine